The 1997 Masters Tournament was the 61st Masters Tournament, held April 10–13 at Augusta National Golf Club in Augusta, Georgia.

Tiger Woods won his first major championship, twelve strokes ahead of runner-up Tom Kite. The margin of victory is, as of 2022, still the largest in the tournament's history. The four-day score of 270 (−18) was also a tournament record until 2020 when it was beaten by Dustin Johnson. Woods also became both the youngest (21) and the first non-white player to win at 

Woods struggled on his first nine holes of the first round, turning at 4-over-par 40. Making four birdies and an eagle gave him a 6-under-par 30 on the back nine for a 70, three shots behind first-round leader John Huston.

In the second and third rounds, Woods scored the best rounds of each day (66-65) to open up a commanding nine-shot lead. A final-round 69 gave Woods a then tournament record 270 (−18), bettering the previous record of 271 set by Jack Nicklaus in 1965 and matched by Raymond Floyd in 1976.

Woods' victory set television ratings records for golf; the final round broadcast on Sunday was seen by an estimated 44 million viewers in the United States.

Field
1. Masters champions
Tommy Aaron, Seve Ballesteros, Gay Brewer, Billy Casper, Charles Coody, Fred Couples (9,13), Ben Crenshaw, Nick Faldo (3,9,10,12,13), Raymond Floyd, Doug Ford, Bernhard Langer, Sandy Lyle, Larry Mize (9,11), Jack Nicklaus, José María Olazábal, Arnold Palmer, Gary Player, Craig Stadler, Tom Watson (10,12,13), Ian Woosnam, Fuzzy Zoeller
George Archer, Jack Burke Jr., Bob Goalby, Ben Hogan, Herman Keiser, Cary Middlecoff, Byron Nelson, Henry Picard, Gene Sarazen, Sam Snead, and Art Wall Jr. did not play.

2. U.S. Open champions (last five years)
Ernie Els (9,10,12,13), Lee Janzen (9,10,11), Steve Jones (10,12,13), Tom Kite, Corey Pavin (9,12,13)

3. The Open champions (last five years)
Tom Lehman (9,10,12,13), Greg Norman (9,10,13), Nick Price (4,9,11)
John Daly did not play.

4. PGA champions (last five years)
Paul Azinger (9), Mark Brooks (10,11,12,13), Steve Elkington (11)

5. U.S. Amateur champion and runner-up
Steve Scott (a)

Tiger Woods forfeited his invitation by turning professional, but qualified via categories 12 & 13.

6. The Amateur champion
Warren Bladon (a)

7. U.S. Amateur Public Links champion
Tim Hogarth (a)

8. U.S. Mid-Amateur champion
Spider Miller (a)

9. Top 24 players and ties from the 1996 Masters
Mark Calcavecchia (13), David Duval (13), David Frost, Scott Hoch (10,12,13), John Huston, Davis Love III (10,13), Jeff Maggert (13), Scott McCarron, Phil Mickelson (11,12,13), Frank Nobilo (10,11), Mark O'Meara (10,12,13), Loren Roberts (12,13), Bob Tway, Duffy Waldorf (13)

10. Top 16 players and ties from the 1996 U.S. Open
David Berganio Jr., Stewart Cink, John Cook (12,13), Dan Forsman, Jim Furyk (13), Ken Green, Colin Montgomerie, John Morse, Vijay Singh (11,13), Sam Torrance

11. Top eight players and ties from 1996 PGA Championship
Per-Ulrik Johansson, Justin Leonard (12,13), Jesper Parnevik, Kenny Perry (13), Tommy Tolles (13)

12. Winners of PGA Tour events since the previous Masters
Stuart Appleby, Guy Boros, Michael Bradley (13), Brad Faxon (13), Ed Fiori, Fred Funk (13), Dudley Hart, David Ogrin, Clarence Rose, Jeff Sluman (13), Paul Stankowski, Steve Stricker (13), D. A. Weibring, Willie Wood, Tiger Woods (13)

13. Top 30 players from the 1996 PGA Tour money list

14. Special foreign invitation
Robert Allenby, Yoshinori Kaneko, Mark McNulty, Masashi Ozaki, Costantino Rocca, Lee Westwood

Round summaries

First round
Thursday, April 10, 1997

John Huston shot 67 (−5) to lead by one stroke over Paul Stankowski. Tiger Woods shot a 40 (+4) on the first nine, but came back into the clubhouse on the back nine with a score of 30 (−6) for a 70 (−2).

Scorecard

Source:

Second round
Friday, April 11, 1997

Woods started the round three strokes back, but a 66 gave him his first lead in a professional major championship, three shots ahead of Colin Montgomerie from Scotland.

Amateurs: Bladon (+7), Scott (+13), Hogarth (+14), Miller (+19)

Scorecard

Cumulative tournament scores, relative to par
Source:

Third round
Saturday, April 12, 1997

Woods shot a 65 in the third round for 201 (−15) and his lead increased to nine shots; the closest competitor was Costantino Rocca from Italy. Montgomerie's 74 dropped him into a tie for sixth.

Scorecard

Cumulative tournament scores, relative to par
Source:

Final round
Sunday, April 13, 1997

Summary

Woods won his first major championship, finishing 12 strokes ahead runner-up Tom Kite. It was the largest victory margin in Masters history, passing Nicklaus' 9-shot winning margin in 1965, and tied for the second largest victory margin in any major championship, only one stroke behind Old Tom Morris' 13-shot winning margin set at the 1862 Open Championship at Prestwick (a mark Woods later surpassed at the 2000 U.S. Open at Pebble Beach when he won by 15 shots). Rocca and Stankowski fell into a tie for fifth.

Final leaderboard

Sources:

Scorecard

Cumulative tournament scores, relative to par
{|class="wikitable" span = 50 style="font-size:85%;
|-
|style="background: Pink;" width=10|
|Birdie
|style="background: PaleGreen;" width=10|
|Bogey
|style="background: Green;" width=10|
|Double bogey
|style="background: Olive;" width=10|
|Triple bogey+
|}
Source:

References

External links
Masters.com – past winners
Augusta.com – 1997 Masters leaderboard and scorecards
  from the Masters (originally broadcast by CBS)

1997
1997 in golf
1997 in American sports
1997 in sports in Georgia (U.S. state)
April 1997 sports events in the United States